Sergei Konstantinovich Popov (21 September 1930 – 25 June 1995) was a Russian marathon runner. He won a gold medal at the 1958 European Championships setting a new world record at 2:15:17; this record stood for more than two years and remained the Soviet national record until 1970. He also set a world record in Moscow, on June 15, 1958, for 30 kilometers, running 1:32:58.8.    
Popov won the Soviet marathon title in 1957, when he ran the world's fastest marathon of the year in 2:19:50 in Moscow, 1958 and 1959, and placed second in 1962 and third in 1963. In 1959, he set the course record at the Košice Peace Marathon, the third year in a row he ran the world's fastest time. He finished fifth at the 1960 Summer Olympics when the winner, Ethiopia's Abebe Bikila, broke Popov's world record by less than a second.

Achievements

References

External links
 
 Légende du Sport Marocain: Feu Abdeslam Radi (1960 Olympic Marathon YouTube video)
 ARRS.net
 ARRS.net

1930 births
1995 deaths
Russian male marathon runners
Athletes (track and field) at the 1960 Summer Olympics
Olympic athletes of the Soviet Union
World record setters in athletics (track and field)
Sportspeople from Irkutsk
European Athletics Championships medalists
Soviet male marathon runners